Hospital de la Caridad may refer to:

 Hospital de la Caridad (Algeciras), a former charity hospital in Algeciras, Spain
 Hospital de la Caridad (Seville), a baroque charity hospital building in Seville, Spain

See also

 Charity Hospital (disambiguation), the literal translation of Hospital de la Caridad into English